Truest Inspiration is the sixth studio album by The Northern Pikes released in 2001.  This was their first album of new music since they reformed in 1999 after a 6-year break.

Following the release of Neptune in 1992 and the subsequent live album called Gig in 1993, the band decided to disband. During their time apart, Jay Semko and Bryan Potvin each released a solo album. However, in 1999 Virgin Records asked the band members for their input on a "greatest hits" package. The band decided to do a short promotional tour following the release of Hits and Assorted Secrets 1984-1993, but found themselves enjoying the more relaxed independence of making their own schedule that they continued touring.

After a live album called Live released in 2000, the band decided to record a new album in the latter half of 2000. No longer signed to Virgin Records, the album was released independently by the band's Square Dog management group.

Track listing

"Echo Off The Beach" (Bryan Potvin) - 4:13
"Little Boy Kelly" (Merl Bryck & Neil Morgan) - 2:37
"Swirl" (Jay Semko) - 5:56
"Christ" (Bryck) - 4:08
"I Can't Compare" (Potvin) - 3:53
"Favourite Cousin (Still In Prison)" (Semko) - 4:21
"Out Of Love" (Bryck) - 3:52
"Michigan" (Potvin) - 4:41
"Head First" (Semko) - 4:02
"Colour Into Colour" (Bryck) - 4:21
"Beautiful Music" (Semko) - 5:28

Album credits

Personnel
Jay Semko - vocals, bass
Bryan Potvin - vocals, guitars
Merl Bryck - vocals, rhythm guitar
Don Schmid - drums, percussion

Additional Personnel
Melanie Doane - vocals, violin on 10
Jack Lenz - piano, hammond organ on 2,11
Bob Egan - pedal steel on 4,6
Jim McGrath - programming on 1,5,7,8
David Baxter - additional guitar, bass, keyboards & other cool stuff

Production
David Baxter - Producer
James Paul & J Elliot - Engineers
James Paul - Mixer
Phil Demetro - mastering at The Lacquer Channel

References
 Liner notes from The Northern Pikes:Truest Inspiration.

2001 albums
The Northern Pikes albums